Nguyễn Nam Anh (born 1 June 1993) is a Vietnamese footballer who is playing for V.League 1 club Đông Á Thanh Hóa.

Club career
Nam Anh joined V.League 1 club Saigon on loan for the 2016 season.

Nam Anh joined V.League 1 club Đông Á Thanh Hóa for the 2023 season.

References

1993 births
Living people
Vietnamese footballers
Association football defenders
V.League 1 players
Hanoi FC players
People from Thanh Hóa province